Origin Systems, Inc. was an American video game developer based in Austin, Texas. It was founded on March 3, 1983, by Richard Garriott and his brother Robert. Origin is best known for their groundbreaking work in multiple genres of video games, such as the Ultima and Wing Commander series. The company was purchased by Electronic Arts in 1992.

History
Brothers Richard and Robert Garriott, their astronaut-engineer father Owen, and programmer Chuck Bueche founded Origin Systems in 1983 because of the trouble they had collecting money owed to Richard for his games released by other companies. Origin was initially based in the Garriotts' garage in Houston, Texas. The company's first game was Ultima III: Exodus; because of Ultima's established reputation and the fact that the company's games were released on computers and not consoles, Origin survived the video-game crash of 1983 which affected console game developers in North America. It published many non-Ultima games, and Richard Garriott claimed that he received the same royalty rate as other developers.

By 1988, Origin had 15 developers in Austin, Texas, and another 35 employees in New Hampshire. By 1989 they had 50 employees  between their New Hampshire and Texas offices. By 1992, Origin Systems had sold more than  software units worldwide.

In September 1992, Electronic Arts acquired the company for $35 million in stock, despite a dispute between the two companies over EA's 1987 game Deathlord. Origin, with about $13 million in annual revenue, stated that it had considered an IPO before agreeing to the deal.

By 1996, Origin had expanded to more than 300 employees, most of whom were divided among small, largely autonomous development teams. In 1997, Origin released one of the earliest graphical MMORPGs, Ultima Online. After this title, Electronic Arts decided that Origin would become an online-only company after the completion of Ultima IX in 1999. However, within a year's time, in part due to Ultima IXs poor reception, EA canceled all of Origin's new development projects, including Ultima Online 2, Privateer Online, and Harry Potter Online. Richard Garriott left Origin shortly after and founded Destination Games in 2000.

In later years, Origin mainly existed to support and expand Ultima Online and to develop further online games based on the Ultima franchise such as Ultima X: Odyssey, originally to be released in 2004 but later canceled. In February 2004, the studio was disbanded by Electronic Arts. The Longbow series of simulation games was developed at Origin and published under the "Jane's Combat Simulations" brand of Electronic Arts. A follow-on project, Jane's A-10, was under development when the project was canceled in late 1998 and the team moved to other projects.

Notable employees

Origin employed many young game developers over its tenure who have since gone on to leading roles in numerous game development companies, especially in Austin.

Among its prominent employees were (alphabetically by surname):

Raymond Benson – Writer, Audio (1992–1993)
Was head writer on Ultima VII: The Black Gate, contributed some writing to Ultima VII Part Two: Serpent Isle, and went on to work as a game designer for MicroProse and Viacom New Media, then later became an official continuation author of the James Bond novels.
Tom Chilton – Lead Designer (2001–2003)
Was lead designer on Ultima Online: Age of Shadows and went on to be a lead designer for Blizzard Entertainment.
Britt Daniel – Sound Designer (1994)
Was a sound designer for numerous titles and went on to found the rock band Spoon.
Ken Demarest – Game Designer, Programmer (1990–1995)
Created the technical prototype for Ultima Online, directed BioForge, led programming on Ultima VII: The Black Gate and coded on Wing Commander.
Martin Galway – Sound Designer/Composer, Audio Technician (1991–1994)
Went on to work at Digital Anvil.
Richard Garriott – Co-Founder, Game Designer, Programmer (1983–2000)
Aka "Lord British", creator of Ultima; later co-founded Destination Games, acquired by NCSoft. Co-founded and now works at Portalarium.
Robert Garriott – Co-Founder, Business (1983–2000)
Brother of Richard Garriott, co-founded Origin Systems and Destination Games.
Raph Koster – Lead Designer (1995–2003)
Later joined Sony Online Entertainment in Austin developing EverQuest II and Star Wars Galaxies.
Scott Kreuser – Supported the entire software roadmap
Went on to work for Dell Computer as a Worldwide New Product Project Manager.
Starr Long – QA Lead, Designer (1992–2000)
Director of Ultima Online, and co-founder of Destination Games.
Denis Loubet – Artist (1989–2002)
Was the first artist Origin hired. He did many box cover paintings, manual illustrations, in-game art and animation, and cinematics.
Mike McShaffry – Lead Developer (1990–1997)
Later co-founded the other Austin studios and has written and taught on game development theory.
Sheri Graner Ray – Writer, Designer (1993–1994)
Went on to work with several major companies including Sony Online Entertainment and Cartoon Network. Also founder of Women in Games International.
Chris Roberts – Game Designer, Creative Director (1988–1996)
Creator of the Wing Commander series and Strike Commander. Co-founded the now-defunct Digital Anvil, acquired by Microsoft, creating Starlancer and contributing to Freelancer space simulator games. Went on to produce a number of Hollywood productions, before co-founding and now working at Cloud Imperium Games, creating the crowdfunded space simulator Star Citizen.
John Romero – Programmer (1987–1988)
Worked at Origin before co-founding id Software. Later co-founded Ion Storm and a number of other game studios. Co-founded and now works at Romero Games.
Andrew Sega – Music Composer (1995–1998)
Aka Necros; was a Software Engineer/Composer who went on to work for Digital Anvil.
Dallas Snell – Vice President of Product Development / Executive Producer (1985–1996)
Head of Product Development, Producer or Executive Producer of Origin's titles between 1986 and 1995. Later served as Director of Business Development for NCSoft North America. Co-founded Portalarium and served as Director of Development and Chief Operating Officer.
Warren Spector – Producer (1989–1996)
Producer of Ultima Underworld: The Stygian Abyss which was developed by Doug Church and Looking Glass Studios, as well as its sequel, System Shock, Wings of Glory and numerous other titles. He later joined Ion Storm and managed its Austin office, creating Deus Ex. Later co-founded the now-defunct Junction Point Studios, acquired by Disney Interactive. Now works at OtherSide Entertainment as its Studio Director, creating System Shock 3.
Paul Steed – Artist (1991–1995)
Was a leading artist on the Wing Commander series and went on to serve as an art lead for id Software on the Quake series.

List of games

Canceled
BioPlus (Add-on for BioForge. Aka. BioForge Plus.)
Carl's Crazy Carnival (action game in vein of Mario and Sonic the Hedgehog)
Citadel (first-person shooter)
Death & Destruction
Space Race (racing game in vein of Road Rash and Super Monaco GP)
Crusader: No Survivors (cancelled multiplayer expansion for Crusader: No Regret)
Crusader 3: No Escape / Crusader: No Mercy / Crusader II
Worlds of Ultima: Arthurian Legends
Ultima Worlds Online: Origin
Harry Potter Online
Jane's A-10
Privateer 3
Strike Team
Wing Commander VII
Ultima X: Odyssey (2004)

References

American companies established in 1983
American companies disestablished in 2004
 
Defunct video game companies of the United States
Video game development companies
Video game companies based in Texas
Defunct companies based in Texas
Companies based in Austin, Texas
Video game companies established in 1983
Video game companies disestablished in 2004
1983 establishments in Texas
2004 disestablishments in Texas
Privately held companies based in Texas
Electronic Arts
Wing Commander (franchise)
1992 mergers and acquisitions